1875 was the 89th season of cricket in England since the foundation of Marylebone Cricket Club (MCC). Nottinghamshire regained its place as the unofficial "Champion County". It was in many ways the last season before pitches began to improve and produce much heavier scoring: it was definitely the last season where "dead shooters" were frequently seen at Lord's before the heavy roller made for regular bounce there.

Champion County

 Nottinghamshire

Playing record (by county)

Leading batsmen (qualification 20 innings)

Leading bowlers (qualification 800 balls)

Events
 Hampshire County Cricket Club returned to first-class county cricket after four seasons absence.
 18 August: formation of Somerset County Cricket Club by a team of amateurs at a meeting in Sidmouth, Devonshire, immediately after a match against a local side.

Notes
An unofficial seasonal title sometimes proclaimed by consensus of media and historians prior to December 1889 when the official County Championship was constituted.  Although there are ante-dated claims prior to 1873, when residence qualifications were introduced, it is only since that ruling that any quasi-official status can be ascribed.

References

Annual reviews
 John Lillywhite’s Cricketer’s Companion (Green Lilly), Lillywhite, 1876
 James Lillywhite’s Cricketers’ Annual (Red Lilly), Lillywhite, 1876
 John Wisden's Cricketers' Almanack 1876

External links
 CricketArchive – season summaries

1875 in English cricket
English cricket seasons in the 19th century